Tridentea pachyrrhiza is a species of plant in the family Apocynaceae. It is endemic to Namibia.  Its natural habitats are rocky areas and cold desert.

References

Flora of Namibia
pachyrrhiza
Least concern plants
Taxonomy articles created by Polbot
Taxa named by Kurt Dinter